McCoy is an unincorporated community in Montgomery County, Virginia, United States. McCoy has a post office with ZIP code 24111. The McCoy post office was established in 1906.

McCoy also has Long Shop-McCoy Volunteer Fire Department/Rescue Squad, that serves as a local community center, it is the area's voting location as well as the location for community functions.

References

Unincorporated communities in Montgomery County, Virginia
Unincorporated communities in Virginia